Euphaedra edwardsii, or Edwards' forester, is a butterfly in the family Nymphalidae. It is found in Guinea, Sierra Leone, Liberia, Ivory Coast, Ghana, Togo, Benin, Nigeria, Cameroon, Gabon, the Republic of the Congo, the Central African Republic, the Democratic Republic of the Congo and Uganda.

Description
 
E. edwardsi Hoeven (42 female , not male). Hindwing on both surfaces with a black discocellular spot. The cells above and beneath with three large black spots. Forewing in the usually uniform greenish grey-brown above, with black veins, in the female red-yellow in the basal part; hindwing yellow-brown above with blackish marginal band and light yellow submarginal spots. The under surface lighter, with or without whitish submarginal spots. Ashanti to Dahomey-In ab. viridis Suff. the basal part of the hindwing is dusky green above instead of red-brownish and the cell-spots are indistinct. Togo. ab. clarus Auriv. is on an average 
lighter and occurs in the Congo region.

Similar species
Other members of the Euphaedra eleus species group q.v.

Biology
It is found in a wide variety of habitats, from wet forests to almost open country.

The larvae feed on Lecaniodiscus cupanioides.

References

Butterflies described in 1845
edwardsii